Several judges of the North Carolina Supreme Court and the North Carolina Court of Appeals, the state's two appellate courts, were elected on November 2, 2004. The 2004 United States presidential election, 2004 United States House election, 2004 United States Senate election, 2004 North Carolina Council of State election and 2004 North Carolina General Assembly election were held on the same day.

Appellate judges in North Carolina are elected to eight-year terms in statewide judicial elections. In 2004, for the first time, all these elections were non-partisan. If more than two candidates filed for a given seat, a non-partisan primary would be held, and the two highest vote-getters, regardless of party, would advance to the general election. The only 2004 race in which more than two candidates filed for the primary was the Thornburg Court of Appeals seat.

Supreme Court (Parker seat)
Associate Justice Sarah Parker, the incumbent, was challenged by Court of Appeals Judge John M. Tyson.

Results

Supreme Court (Orr seat)
The resignation of Associate Justice Robert F. Orr, too late for a primary election to be held, led to a situation in which there was no primary election to eliminate candidates, but rather, the winner was simply determined by plurality. Eight candidates filed: Assistant U.S. Attorney Paul Newby (who received the endorsement of the state Republican Party), North Carolina Superior Court Judge Howard Manning, Pre-Paid Legal Services attorney and former judicial law clerk Rachel Hunter, Administrative Law Judge Fred Morrison, attorney Ronnie Ansley, former appeals court judge Betsy McCrodden, current appeals court judge Jim Wynn, and attorney Marvin Schiller (who had just lost in the primary for the Thornburg Court of Appeals seat).

Results

Court of Appeals (McGee seat)
Incumbent Judge Linda McGee was challenged by attorney Bill Parker.

Results

Court of Appeals (Bryant seat)
Incumbent Judge Wanda G. Bryant had been appointed to the Court by the Governor following her 2002 defeat for a different seat. She was challenged by Wake County District Court Judge Alice Stubbs.

Results

Court of Appeals (Thornburg seat)
Incumbent Judge Alan Thornburg had been appointed to the court by the Governor. Three candidates filed to challenge Thornburg for a full term: Barbara Jackson, who was then general counsel at the N.C. Department of Labor, along with attorneys Marcus W. Williams and Marvin Schiller. Jackson and Thornburg finished first and second, respectively, in the July primary, thereby qualifying them to compete in the general election.

Results

References

Judicial
2004